Maud Jayet (born 3 April 1996) is a Swiss competitive sailor.

She competed in the Laser Radial event at the 2020 Summer Olympics, held July–August 2021 in Tokyo.

References

External links
 
 

 

1996 births
Living people
Swiss female sailors (sport)
Olympic sailors of Switzerland
Sailors at the 2020 Summer Olympics – Laser Radial
Sportspeople from Lausanne
20th-century Swiss women
21st-century Swiss women